Acalyptris pyrenaica is a moth of the family Nepticulidae. It is only known from the Pyrenees in Spain and the Eifel region in Germany.

The wingspan is 4–5.6 mm.

The immature stages are unknown, but adults were caught by sweeping grassland vegetation from May to July. The habitat consists of limestone grassland in the Eifel mountains and a mountain pasture in the Pyrenees.

References 

Nepticulidae
Moths of Europe
Moths described in 1993